FC Barcelona returned to its previous glorious league ways under the guidance of new coach Louis van Gaal. The highly rated coach, hired from Ajax Amsterdam, brought lethal striker Sonny Anderson and the attacking midfielder Rivaldo with him. But surprisedly Barcelona sold Ronaldo to Inter Milan just before season begin and Sonny Anderson subsequently became the main striker. He introduced his 4-3-3 formation to Barcelona, under which Rivaldo scored 20 goals in the league as centre forward. Under van Gaal at helm in his first season, Barcelona won their 15th La Liga title, 2nd European Super Cup title as well as 24th Copa del Rey title (thus winning a domestic double) but Barcelona crashed out of the UEFA Champions League, following a lacklustre performance in the First Group phase. In fact, Barcelona ended up last in the group, snatching only a single victory, with two draws and three defeats preventing Barcelona from winning the treble.

Barcelona had a marvelous second half of the season, in which it kept pace with La Liga leaders Real Madrid, before ultimately hunting them down.

Squad
Squad at end of season

Transfers

Winter

Competitions

La Liga

League table

Results by round

Matches

Copa del Rey

Eightfinals

Quarterfinals

Semifinals

Final

UEFA Champions League

Group stage

Supercopa de España

UEFA Super Cup

Friendlies

Statistics

Players statistics

See also
FC Barcelona
1997–98 UEFA Champions League
1997–98 La Liga
1997–98 Copa del Rey
Spanish Super Cup

References

External links
 
 FCBarcelonaweb.co.uk English Speaking FC Barcelona Supporters
 ESPNsoccernet: Barcelona Team Page 
 FC Barcelona (Spain) profile
 uefa.com - UEFA Champions League
 Web Oficial de la Liga de Fútbol Profesional
 
 

FC Barcelona seasons
Barcelona
Spanish football championship-winning seasons